The 2019 Men's NORCECA Volleyball Champions Cup was the second edition of the tournament, and was held in Colorado Springs, United States from 22 to 24 August 2019. The champions which had not yet qualified to the 2020 Summer Olympics qualified for the 2020 North American Olympic Qualification Tournament.

Qualification
The hosts United States and the top three ranked teams from the NORCECA Ranking as of 1 January 2019 qualified for the tournament. Rankings are shown in brackets except the hosts who ranked 1st.

 (Hosts)
 (2)
 (3)
 (4)

Squads

Venue
 OTC Sports Center I, Colorado Springs, United States

Pool standing procedure
 Number of matches won
 Match points
 Points ratio
 Sets ratio
 Result of the last match between the tied teams

Match won 3–0: 5 match points for the winner, 0 match points for the loser
Match won 3–1: 4 match points for the winner, 1 match point for the loser
Match won 3–2: 3 match points for the winner, 2 match points for the loser

Round robin
All times are Mountain Daylight Time (UTC−06:00).

Final standing

Awards

Most Valuable Player
 Robertlandy Simón
Best Scorer
 Blake Scheerhoorn
Best Server
 Jesús Herrera
Best Digger
 Jeremy Davies
Best Receiver
 Yonder García
Best Setter
 Adrián Goide
Best Outside Spikers
 Cody Kessel
 Osniel Melgarejo
Best Middle Blockers
 Robertlandy Simón
 Patrick Gasman
Best Opposite Spiker
 Blake Scheerhoorn
Best Libero
 Jeremy Davies

See also
2019 Women's NORCECA Volleyball Champions Cup

References

External links
Official website
Regulations
Awards

NORCECA
2019 in American sports
International volleyball competitions hosted by the United States
Sports competitions in Colorado Springs, Colorado
2019 in sports in Colorado
Volleyball in Colorado